Fabrice Catherine (born 12 May 1973 in Caen, Basse-Normandie) is a retired French football goalkeeper.

External links
 Fabrice Catherine's profile, stats & pics
 

French footballers
Association football goalkeepers
Stade Malherbe Caen players
CS Sedan Ardennes players
Tours FC players
Stade Rennais F.C. players
AS Cherbourg Football players
Ligue 2 players
1973 births
Living people
Footballers from Caen